Alan B. McElroy is an American screenwriter, producer, and director of film, television, comic books, and video games. He is best known for his collaborations with Todd McFarlane on the Spawn franchise, and for penning horror films such as Halloween 4: The Return of Michael Myers and Wrong Turn.

Life and career 
McElroy's screenwriting debut was Halloween 4: The Return of Michael Myers, the fourth entry in the long-running horror franchise. Due to an impending strike by the Writers Guild of America (of which McElroy is a member), McElroy was forced to develop a concept, pitch the story, and send in the final draft in under eleven days. McElroy has mostly written action (Rapid Fire, The Marine, Tekken) and horror films (Wrong Turn, Wheels of Terror, Three). He is also a long-time collaborator of Todd McFarlane and has frequently worked to different capacities on the Spawn franchise, having written the Curse of the Spawn comic series, the 1997 motion picture, and was the co-creator and showrunner of the critically acclaimed animated adaptation. His 2003 film Wrong Turn spawned a franchise, with an additional 5 films being produced, albeit without McElroy's involvement.

Personal life 
McElroy is a native of Cleveland, Ohio, but has resided in Los Angeles since the early nineties. His wife Kymm is an artist and homemaker, and he has two daughters (Ashleigh and Mackenzie) and one son (Matthew). McElroy is a Christian, and two of his films (Three, Left Behind: The Movie) are adaptations of religious source material.

Filmography
Film writer
 Halloween 4: The Return of Michael Myers (1988)
 Rapid Fire (1992)
 Spawn (1997)
 Left Behind: The Movie (2000)
 Ballistic: Ecks vs. Sever (2002)
 Wrong Turn (2003)
 The Marine (2006)
 Three (2006)
 Tekken (2009)
 The Marine 4: Moving Target (2015)
 The Perfect Guy (2015) (Story only)
 The Condemned 2 (2015)
 Fractured (2019)
 Wrong Turn (2021) (Also executive producer)

Television

Video Game
 Ground Zero: Texas (1993)

Acting credits

References

External links 
 
 

American male screenwriters
Television producers from Ohio
American comics writers
Writers from Cleveland
Living people
Film directors from Ohio
Screenwriters from Ohio
20th-century American screenwriters
21st-century American screenwriters
20th-century American male writers
21st-century American male writers
1960 births